The Kamov Ka-15 (NATO reporting name Hen) was a Soviet two-seat utility helicopter with coaxial rotors, which first flew on 14 April 1952 at the hands of test pilot D. K. Yefremov. It was the world's first mass-produced coaxial helicopter. State acceptance trials were completed in 1955, and the helicopter entered production the following year at aircraft factory No. 99 in Ulan-Ude. It was a precursor to the Ka-18 and was fitted with the M-14 engine (helicopter version). It was primarily used for bush patrol, agricultural purposes and fishery control.

Variants
 Ka-15 – two-seat light utility helicopter for the Soviet Navy.
 Ka-15M – two-seat light utility helicopter. Civilian version of the Ka-15.
 Ka-18 – four-seat light utility helicopter.

Operators

 
 Aeroflot
 Soviet Naval Aviation

Specifications (Ka-15M)

See also

References

 Gunston, Bill. The Osprey Encyclopedia of Russian Aircraft 1875–1995. London:Osprey, 1995. .
 Stroud, John. Soviet Transport Aircraft since 1945. London:Putnam, 1968. .

Kamov aircraft
1950s Soviet civil utility aircraft
Kamov Ka-015
Coaxial rotor helicopters
Single-engined piston helicopters
Aircraft first flown in 1952